Meryta raiateensis is a species of plant in the family Araliaceae. It is endemic to French Polynesia.

References

Flora of French Polynesia
raiateensis
Data deficient plants
Taxonomy articles created by Polbot